AUUG  was an Australian association and users' group. It described itself as the organisation for Unix, Linux and Open Source professionals. Its aim was to build a community of those interested in open systems and open standards. The newsletter AUUGN is pronounced .

AUUG ran nationally with chapters in most states and territories. The main activities were a website, mailing lists, the AUUGN newsletter, various conferences, and chapter meetings.

Along with USENIX, AUUG was one of the oldest Unix user groups in the world. Founded in 1975 by John Lions and others as the Australian Unix systems User Group, it later broadened its remit but retained the name. It was constituted on 27 August 1984 and incorporated as "AUUG Inc" on 26 August 1988 in Victoria. AUUG was dissolved between 2010 and January 2015, though it had been in decline for years, and its members were asked to vote on whether to continue as early as 2007. There is an AUUG Preservation Society which took over management of the auug.org.au domain name in June 2011.

As of 9 January 2015, the Victorian Incorporated Association Register lists A0016636N (AUUG Inc) as Deregistered with its last return filed in 1995.

National conference 
Some conferences included three days of tutorials before hand.

 2007 – 12 to 14 October, Melbourne, 
 2006 – 10 to 13 October, Rendezvous Hotel in Melbourne, 
 2005 – 19 to 21 October, Carlton Crest Hotel in Sydney, 
 2004 – 29 to 31 August, Duxton Hotel, Flinders St, Melbourne, 
 2002 – 4 to 6 September, Melbourne,

Annual General Meetings 
 , CSC Office in Braddon, ACT
 , Melbourne Museum.
 , Rendezvous Hotel, 328 Flinders Street, Melbourne, Victoria
 , Carlton Crest Hotel in Sydney
 , The Duxton Hotel

Governance

Other activities

Other AUUGs
AUUG was not associated with the Atlanta UNIX Users Groups (AUUG).

See also
Related organisations
Australian Computer Society
Linux Australia
Open Source Industry Australia
SAGE-AU
Linux User Groups in Australia and Open Source Community Groups
Other Linux Open Source Groups in Australia and New Zealand

References

External links

Frequently Asked Questions about AUUG (dated 1995)
AUUGN archive at Google Books (more publications here)
Announcement of AUUG Preservation Society, an Unincorporated entity
AUUG Preservation Society mailing list

Information technology organizations based in Oceania
1975 establishments in Australia
Organizations established in 1975